Hudnut is a surname. Notable people with the surname include:

David Hudnut, American artist
Joseph Hudnut (1886–1968), American architect scholar
Peter Hudnut (born 1980), American water polo player
Richard Hudnut (1855–1928), American businessman
William H. Hudnut III (1932–2016), American politician